Chalid "Die Faust" Arrab (born May 28, 1975) is a German-Moroccan kickboxer and mixed martial artist. He trains at Team Golden Glory in Breda under Cor Hemmers.

Biography and career
Arrab's amateur boxing record of 34 Wins and 31 KOs out of 37 bouts has earned him the nickname "Die Faust" ("The Fist" in German). On April 29, 2006 Arrab entered the K-1 World GP 2006 in Las Vegas as a heavy underdog. Just one week before the fight he was involved in serious car crash in Germany. Arrab walked away unharmed.

In the quarterfinals Arrab took on a former wrestler, Sean O'Haire.  Arrab stepped in quickly firing with series of uppercuts and knocking out the American in first round. 

In the semifinals he met Carter Williams. Midway through the second round Williams dropped Arrab with a right knee and Arrab ended up losing the fight with a split decision. Under K-1's substitution rule Williams could not continue due a broken nose and shin injury suffered in his fight with Arrab and the fortunate German was sent back in to face Gary Goodridge in the GP tournament final.

In the first round Goodridge threw in a quick left hook to score an early knock down. Heading into the third round, Die Faust was trailing badly on all cards due to the two downs. The only thing that could possibly win it for Arrab was a KO. Midway through the third round he caught Goodridge with a right hook to the jaw and dropped him. "The Fist" capped his comeback in dramatic fashion and became the K-1 World GP 2006 USA Champion.

On September 30, 2006 at K-1 World Grand Prix 2006 Final Eliminations at Osaka, Japan Arrab earned himself a unanimous decision win over Japanese fighter Musashi and qualified for his first ever appearance at K-1 World Grand Prix 2006 Finals.

On December 2, 2006 at K-1 World GP quarterfinals Arrab met 4 times K-1 World Champion Ernesto Hoost after the original three rounds the judges ruled a draw and an additional round was added, Arrab lost that extra round by unanimous decision.

He is married to Dutch actress and TV Presenter Jorinde Moll.

Arrab was scheduled to fight on August 11 in Las Vegas, against Mighty Mo.  However Arrab was unable to secure a visa in time, and was replaced by Stefan "Blitz" Leko.

Titles

 2006 K-1 World Grand Prix in Las Vegas Champion

Kickboxing 

|-  bgcolor="#FFBBBB"
| 2010-10-02 || Loss ||align=left| Dževad Poturak || K-1 World Grand Prix 2010 in Seoul Final 16 || Seoul, South Korea || TKO (Corner Stoppage) || 3 || 0:06
|-  bgcolor="#FFBBBB"
| 2008-09-27 || Loss||align=left| Ruslan Karaev || K-1 World GP 2008 Final 16 || Seoul, South Korea || TKO (Referee Stoppage) || 2 || 2:30
|-  bgcolor="#FFBBBB"
| 2008-04-13 || Loss||align=left| Alexander Pitchkounov || K-1 World Grand Prix 2008 in Yokohama || Yokohama, Japan || 2 Ext. R. Decision (Split) || 5 || 3:00
|-  bgcolor="#FFBBBB"
| 2007-09-29 || Loss||align=left| Glaube Feitosa || K-1 World GP 2007 in Seoul Final 16 || Seoul, South Korea || Decision (Unanimous) || 3 || 3:00
|-  bgcolor="#FFBBBB"
| 2006-12-02 ||Loss ||align=left| Ernesto Hoost || K-1 World Grand Prix 2006 || Tokyo, Japan || Ext. R. Decision (Unanimous) || 4 || 3:00
|-  bgcolor=#CCFFCC
| 2006-09-30 || Win ||align=left| Musashi || K-1 World Grand Prix 2006 in Osaka Opening Round || Osaka, Japan || Decision (Split) || 3 || 3:00
|-  bgcolor=#CCFFCC
| 2006-04-29 || Win ||align=left| Gary Goodridge || K-1 World Grand Prix 2006 in Las Vegas || Las Vegas, Nevada, United States || KO (Right Hook) || 3 || 1:00
|-
! style=background:white colspan=9 |
|-
|-  bgcolor="#FFBBBB"
| 2006-04-29 || Loss||align=left| Carter Williams || K-1 World Grand Prix 2006 in Las Vegas || Las Vegas, Nevada, United States || Decision (Split) || 3 || 3:00
|-
! style=background:white colspan=9 |
|-
|-  bgcolor=#CCFFCC
| 2006-04-29 || Win ||align=left| Sean O'Haire || K-1 World Grand Prix 2006 in Las Vegas || Las Vegas, Nevada, United States || KO (Right Uppercut) || 1 || 0:23
|-  bgcolor=#CCFFCC
| 2005-11-05 || Win ||align=left| Hiromitsu Kanehara || Hero's 2005 in Seoul || Seoul, South Korea || Decision (Majority) || 2 || 3:00
|-  bgcolor="#FFBBBB"
| 2005-08-13 || Loss||align=left| Scott Lighty || K-1 World Grand Prix 2005 in Las Vegas II || Las Vegas, Nevada || Decision (Unanimous) || 3 || 3:00
|-  bgcolor=#CCFFCC
| 2005-08-13 || Win ||align=left| Hiraku Hori || K-1 World Grand Prix 2005 in Las Vegas II || Las Vegas, Nevada, United States || Decision (Unanimous) || 3 || 3:00
|-  bgcolor=#CCFFCC
| 2005-03-26 || Win ||align=left| Yukiya Naito || K-1 Hero's 1 || Saitama, Japan || Decision (Unanimous) || 2 || 3:00
|-  bgcolor="#FFBBBB"
| 2003-06-14 || Loss ||align=left| Cyril Abidi || K-1 World Grand Prix 2003 in Paris || Paris, France || KO (Right Hook) || 2 || 1:32
|-  bgcolor=#CCFFCC
| 2003-06-14 || Win ||align=left| Pele Reid || K-1 World Grand Prix 2003 in Paris || Paris, France || Decision (Unanimous) || 3 || 3:00
|-  bgcolor=#CCFFCC
| 2002-06-02 || Win ||align=left| Ryushi Yanagisawa || K-1 Survival 2002 || Toyama, Japan || TKO (Doctor Stoppage) || 3 || 3:00
|-
| colspan=9 | Legend:

Mixed martial arts record

|-
| Win 
| align=center| 7–3
| Hiromitsu Kanehara 
| Decision (majority) 
| Hero's 2005 in Seoul 
|  
| align=center| 2 
| align=center| 5:00 
| Seoul, South Korea 
| 
|-
| Win 
| align=center| 6–3
| Yukiya Naito 
| Decision (unanimous) 
| Hero's 1 
|  
| align=center| 2 
| align=center| 5:00 
| Saitama, Saitama, Japan 
| 
|-
| Loss 
| align=center| 5–3
| Kazuhiro Nakamura 
| Submission (armbar) 
| PRIDE Bushido 3 
|  
| align=center| 1 
| align=center| 4:45 
| Yokohama, Japan 
| 
|-
| Win 
| align=center| 5–2
| Rodney Glunder 
| Decision (unanimous) 
| PRIDE Bushido 1 
| 
| align=center| 2 
| align=center| 5:00 
| Saitama, Saitama, Japan 
| 
|-
| Loss 
| align=center| 4–2
| Jeremy Horn 
| Decision (unanimous) 
| 2H2H 6 - Simply the Best 6 
|  
| align=center| 1 
| align=center| 15:00 
| Rotterdam, Netherlands 
| 
|-
| Win 
| align=center| 4–1
| Stanislav Nuschik 
| KO (punches) 
| M-1 MFC - European Championship 2002
|  
| align=center| 1  
| align=center| 3:46 
| Saint Petersburg, Russia 
| 
|-
| Win 
| align=center| 3–1
| Roman Zentsov 
| KO 
| M-1 MFC - Russia vs. the World 2 
|  
| align=center| 
| align=center| 0:53 
| Saint Petersburg, Russia 
| 
|-
| Win 
| align=center| 2–1
| Peter Varga 
| Submission (arm lock) 
| MillenniumSports - Veni Vidi Vici 
|  
| align=center| 
| align=center| 
| Veenendaal, Netherlands 
| 
|-
| Loss 
| align=center| 1–1
| Ramazan Mezhidov 
| Submission (rear naked choke)  
| IAFC - Pankration World Championship 2000 
|  
| align=center| 1 
| 
| Moscow, Russia 
| 
|-
| Win 
| align=center| 1–0
| Spartak Kochnev 
| TKO (strikes) 
| IAFC - Pankration World Championship 2000 
|  
| align=center| 1 
| 
| Moscow, Russia 
|

See also 
List of K-1 events
List of K-1 champions
List of male kickboxers

References

External links

Team Golden Glory Official Site
Profile at K-1

1975 births
Living people
German expatriates in the Netherlands
German male kickboxers
German male mixed martial artists
German Muay Thai practitioners
German people of Moroccan descent
Heavyweight kickboxers
Light heavyweight mixed martial artists
Mixed martial artists utilizing boxing
Mixed martial artists utilizing Muay Thai
Mixed martial artists utilizing kickboxing
Sportspeople from Cologne